Dwight Eastman was the last mayor of West Carleton Township before it was amalgamated into the new City of Ottawa.

Eastman served as mayor of West Carleton from 1995 until 2001. He was elected in the 2000 Ottawa election as city councillor representing the new West Carleton Ward. He served as a city councillor until 2003.

Eastman ran for the Ontario Liberal Party in the 1999 Ontario general election in Lanark—Carleton, but lost to Norm Sterling.

Currently, Eastman serves as a director on the Carleton Landowners Association which favours the separation of rural parts of Ottawa to form a new Carleton County municipality.

References

Year of birth missing (living people)
Living people
Ottawa city councillors
Mayors of West Carleton Township